Technocrats Group of Institutions is the oldest and largest NBA Accredited Education group in central India. It is affiliated to RGPV - Rajiv Gandhi Proudyogiki Vishwavidyalaya.

The college runs 4 Engineering, 2 Pharmacy, 1 Management and 1 Commerce and Science institute. Every year it has a 4,300+ intake with 17,000+ Students on Campus, and 1,100+ faculty members.

See also
List of educational institutions in Bhopal

External links
 

Engineering colleges in Madhya Pradesh
Universities and colleges in Madhya Pradesh
Universities and colleges in Bhopal
Education in Bhopal